Justin Price (born 26 September 1972) is a South African former cricketer. He played in two first-class matches for Border in 1994/95.

See also
 List of Border representative cricketers

References

External links
 

1972 births
Living people
South African cricketers
Border cricketers
People from Makhanda, Eastern Cape
Cricketers from the Eastern Cape